Clear Creek High School is located in League City, Texas, in the Clear Creek Independent School District. The school serves most of League City and the cities of Kemah, Clear Lake Shores, Nassau Bay, and Webster.

The school colors are maroon and white. The school's mascot is Willie The Wildcat.

History

Clear Creek High School was established in 1957 as the first high school in the Clear Creek Independent School District. Its first graduating class was the Class of 1958.

By 1972, Clear Creek High School was overpopulated and a second district high school, Clear Lake High School was opened.

Feeder patterns
The following elementary schools feed into Clear Creek High School: Falcon Pass, Ferguson, Goforth, Hyde, League City, McWhirter, Robinson, and Stewart and Parr

The following intermediate schools feed into Clear Creek High School: League City, Space Center, Victory Lakes, and the newest intermediate school Clear Creek IS.

Clear Springs High School took portions of the Clear Creek High School attendance zone when it opened in 2007. Bauerschlag, Gilmore, Hall, Ross, Creekside, and some of Victory Lakes will no longer feed into Clear Creek.

Clear Falls High School took portions of the Clear Creek High School attendance zone when it opened in 2010.

Notable alumni 
 Jay Buhner,  1982, former  Major League Baseball player for the Seattle Mariners.
Phil Cardella, professional MMA fighter.
Jarred Cosart,  2008, current Major League Baseball player for the San Diego Padres.
 Richard Garriott (also known as Lord British), designer of games such as Ultima and Akalabeth, son of American astronaut Owen Garriot.  Richard launched into space aboard a Soyuz rocket on October 12, 2008, to become the first offspring of an American astronaut to travel in space.
Scott Mitchell  2001, a former wide receiver in the Arena Football League and Canadian Football League
Cliff Olander, American player of gridiron football
 Chase Ortiz, former football player for the Winnipeg Blue Bombers of the Canadian Football League
 James Patton, former football player for the Buffalo Bills of the National Football League
 Christopher Sabat  1992, Voice Actor/Producer. Best known for his role as Vegeta in Funimation Dragon Ball media.
 Riley Salmon, 2008 Olympic indoor volleyball gold medalist (also competed in 2004).
 Susan Swift,  1982, child actress.

References

External links

School district website

High schools in Galveston County, Texas
Galveston Bay Area
Clear Creek Independent School District high schools
1957 establishments in Texas
Educational institutions established in 1957